"The Lion and the Lamb" is a single from the contemporary Christian music group Big Daddy Weave. It peaked at No. 2 on Christian Airplay and No. 2 on Billboard Hot Christian Songs. The Lion and the Lamb is Big Daddy Weave's 15th top 10 song.

The song was written by Leeland Mooring, Brenton Brown and Brian Johnson and was initially released by Bethel Music and Leeland as a part of its successful release, Have It All.

Charts

Weekly charts

Year-end charts

Certifications

References

2015 songs
Big Daddy Weave songs